Brisbane Airport is a coastal suburb in the City of Brisbane, Queensland, Australia.

The majority of the land is occupied by the Brisbane Airport. Airport Drive and Moreton Drive link the airport with the Gateway Motorway.

History
Brisbane Airport is situated in the Yugarabul traditional Aboriginal country.

The land occupied by the Brisbane airport was originally part of the suburbs of Eagle Farm and Pinkenba. In 2011, Rachel Nolan, the former Queensland minister for Finance, Natural Resources, and the Arts, published an official notice amending the boundaries of Eagle Farm, Pinkenba, and Hamilton, and established the new suburb of Brisbane Airport.

Facilities 

The Skygate Airport Village consists of an  precinct that is designated for retail and commercial usage including: a GP Clinic available to the public, the warehouse retail factory outlet DFO and Novotel airport hotel.

The Airport Industrial Park is a proposed precinct which includes  of land designated for light and general industry. Development had commenced in 2019. The Airport Industrial Park is located next to the Export Park precinct.

The Domestic Terminal railway station and International Terminal railway station provide access to commuter railway services. The Airport line services are operated by Airtrain Citylink, but are integrated with the Queensland Rail commuter rail network. Government-subsidised Translink fares are exempted for Airtrain services. There is also an inter-terminal bus connecting the two terminals, and the Skygate Shopping Precinct including DFO and Novotel hotel.

References

Suburbs of the City of Brisbane
Brisbane Airport